Adam Falkner is an American author, poet, artist, and educator.

Falkner is a Pushcart Prize nominee. His work has appeared in The New York Times, and he has been a featured performer at President Barack Obama's Grassroots Ball at the 2009 Presidential Inauguration.

Education
Falkner is from Ann Arbor, Michigan, and attended the University of Michigan as an undergraduate student. He holds a MA in English from Brooklyn College, and a PhD in English & Education from Columbia University.

Career
Falkner's writing and work focus on intersectional themes of race, gender, queer life and social justice education.

Writing
Falkner's book, The Willies, is a  portrait of the "journey into queerhood" in America. The book has received praise from National Book Award-winning author Andrew Solomon, and from writers and critics Saeed Jones, Hanif Abdurraqib, and Patricia Smith for its “vulnerability, determination, lyricism and incisiveness.” The Willies was the winner of the Midwestern Independent Book Award and the Foreward Reviews Gold Medal prize.

Falkner has been nominated for a Pushcart Prize. His work also has appeared in The New York Times and on TED, and he was a featured performer at President Barack Obama's Grassroots Ball at the 2009 Presidential Inauguration.

Educational leadership
Prior to pursuing doctoral study at Columbia University's Teachers College, Falkner taught high school English in New York City's public schools. He founded the Dialogue Arts Project, and is a national lecturer and consultant around themes of racial equity and culturally empowering education. He has taught English Education and Sociology at Vassar College and Columbia University's Teachers College.

Scholarship and research
Falkner is a scholar of critical English education. His research, initially under the direction of Dr. Ernest Morrell, examines performance and storytelling rituals in schools and companies as tools to cultivate (and measure impact around) dialogue pertaining to identity, culture and politics.

Acting and others
Falkner is also an actor and a musician. He has played supporting roles in several films, including Lionsgate's Love, Beats & Rhymes, which starred rappers Azealia Banks and Common.

Personal life
Falkner is gay. He currently lives in Brooklyn, New York.

Bibliography
Books
The Willies. Button Poetry, 2020

Chapbooks
Adoption. Diode Editions, 2018
Ten For Faheem, 2012

Articles
The Power of Touch. The Guardian, 2020
Race and Voting Rights: The All-Too Familiar Battle for the Ballet. PBS' World Channel, 2020

Poems
Love Me A Man Who Cries. Catapult, 2020
The Year The Wu-Tang Drops. THRUSH, 2017
Connor Everywhere But. Painted Bride Quarterly, 2012

Anthologized
Resisting Arrest, University of Georgia Press, 2018
The BreakBeat Poets: New American Poetry in the Age of Hip Hop. Haymarket Books, 2016
Uncommon Core: Contemporary Poems for Living and Learning. Red Beard Press, 2014

References

External links

The Willies at Button Poetry Press

Living people
American male poets
Writers from Ann Arbor, Michigan
American gay writers
Year of birth missing (living people)
21st-century LGBT people
21st-century American poets
21st-century American male writers
American LGBT poets
LGBT people from Michigan
Gay poets